John Hutton O'Connor   was Archdeacon of Emly from 1880 to 1904.

Hutton was educated at Trinity College, Dublin and ordained in 1854.

He served at Kilrush (Curate); Cappamore (Perpetual Curate);Grean (Rector) and Borris (Rector).

References

Archdeacons of Emly
19th-century Irish Anglican priests
20th-century Irish Anglican priests
Alumni of Trinity College Dublin